Tsotne Bendianishvili (born 27 December 2002) is a Georgian professional footballer who plays for Belgian club Winkel Sport.

Club career 
Having already made a few bench appearances and signed his first contract for Kortrijk during the 2021–22 season, Tsotne Bendianishvili made his professional debut for the club on the 2 February 2022, replacing Michiel Jonckheere in the extra-time of a 2–0 home D1A loss to Antwerp.

References

External links

Pro League profile

2002 births
Living people
Footballers from Georgia (country)
Belgian footballers
Georgia (country) youth international footballers
Association football midfielders
Footballers from Tbilisi
K.V. Kortrijk players
Sint-Eloois-Winkel Sport players
Belgian Pro League players
Expatriate footballers from Georgia (country)